Gabriel Levin (born 1948, Paris) is a poet, translator, and essayist.

Biography
Gabriel Levin is the son of American novelist Meyer Levin and French novelist Tereska Torrès. His younger brother Mikael Levin is a New York-based photographer. While growing up, Gabriel and his family split their time between New York, Paris, and Israel. Today he lives in Jerusalem. Writing of his volume of essays A Dune's Twisted Edge, poet Ange Mlinko has described Levin as "an American-born Israeli poet who has parlayed his restless peripatetics into a poetics."

Literary career
Levin is one of the founding editors of Ibis Editions, a small non-profit press devoted to publishing literature of the Levant. His work has appeared in numerous literary magazines including P. N. Review, The Times Literary Supplement, Chicago Review, Raritan, Parnassus, and The Guardian.  In 2012 British composer Alexander Goehr set Levin's book To These Dark Steps to music for tenor, children's choir, and ensemble. The piece premiered in September 2012 at the CBSO Centre in Birmingham. Levin's writing has been described as part of the "Neo-modernist" tradition.

Published works

Poetry
Sleepers of Beulah – Sinclair-Stevenson, London 1991
Ostraca – Anvil Press Poetry, London 2000; French translation Ostraca, Edition bilingue français-anglais, Le Bruit du temps, 2010
The Maltese Dreambook – Anvil Press Poetry, London 2008
To These Dark Steps, Anvil Press Poetry, London 2012
Coming Forth By Day, Carcanet, Manchester 2014
Errant, Carcanet, Manchester 2018

Prose
Hezekiah's Tunnel – Publisher: Ibis Editions; 1997 (French translation: Le Tunnel d'Ezéchias et deux autres récits, Le Bruit du temps, 2010)  [a] "delightful, discursive but moody midnight meditation on Jerusalem"

Essays
The Dune's Twisted Edge, Journeys in the Levant – Chicago University Press, Chicago 2013

Translations
Poems from the Diwan – Yehuda Halevi (Author), Gabriel Levin (Translator) Anvil Press Poetry 2002
On the Sea: Poems by Yehuda Halevi – Translated and introduced by Gabriel Levin, Ibis Press
The Little Bookseller Oustaz Ali by Rassim; "ravishly" (The Jerusalem Post) translated and introduced by Gabriel Levin
So What: New & Selected Poems (With a Story) 1971–2005 by Taha Muhammad Ali (Author), Peter Cole (Translator), Yahya Hijazi, and Gabriel Levin (Translator and Introduction, Copper Canyon Press, 2005)
Never Mind: Twenty Poems and a Story by Taha Muhammad Ali (Author), Peter Cole (Translator), Yahya Hijazi (Translator), and Gabriel Levin 2000  Ibis Press . 
Muck, A novel, by Dror Burstein, Farrar, Straus and Giroux, 2018

Collections
The Water's Edge: Meetings of Image And Word, Ed. Ardyn Halter, with poems by Jennie Feldman, Seamus Heaney, Geoffrey Hill, Gabriel Levin, Michael Longley, Jamie McKendrick, Paul Muldoon, Don Paterson, Robin Robertson, and Stephen Romer, Lund Humphries, Burlington 2006.

Other
Found in Translation: 100 Years of Modern Hebrew Poetry by Robert Friend (translator editor) and Gabriel Levin (introduction and biographical notes) -1999
Pleasant if somewhat rude views by Mikael and Gabriel Levin, August 2005 One Star Press
 Préface to D. H. Lawrence, Croquis étrusques, Le Bruit du temps, 2010.

See also
Marek Szwarc
Boaz Levin

References

External links
Ibis edition's official website
Stephen Romer's review of Poems from the Diwan
Eric Ormsby's review of Ostraca and Poems from the Diwan
About To These Dark Steps / The Fathers are Watching by Alexander Goehr
 Review of The Dunes twisted Edge, Haaretz
 After Webern, featured in TLS, introduced by Andrew McCulloch
Sleeper in the Wadi, featured in The Guardian
 Review The Maltese Dreambook , Charles Bainbridge, The Guardian
Review of The Dune's Twisted Edge, Kanishk Tharoor, The National
 Henry King "In the Footsteps of Gabriel Levin, PN review
 Adam Kirsch, review of "The Dunes Twisted Edge"
 starred review of "Muck", by Dror Burstein, tras. Gabriel Levin, Kirkus reviews

Israeli Jews
Writers from Jerusalem
1948 births
Living people
French emigrants to Israel
Israeli people of French-Jewish descent
Israeli people of Polish-Jewish descent
Writers from Paris
20th-century translators
21st-century translators
Israeli male poets
20th-century Israeli poets
21st-century Israeli poets
Israeli translators
20th-century French male writers
21st-century male writers
French male non-fiction writers